The 1979 Bank of Oklahoma Classic was a men's tennis tournament played on outdoor hard courts at the Shadow Mountain Racquet Club in Tulsa, Oklahoma in the United States that was part of the 1979 Colgate-Palmolive Grand Prix. It was the second edition of the tournament was held from April 9 through April 15, 1979. First-seeded Jimmy Connors won the singles title and earned $8,750 first-prize money.

Finals

Singles
 Jimmy Connors defeated  Eddie Dibbs 6–7, 7–5, 6–1
 It was Connors' 4th singles title of the year and the 75th of his career.

Doubles
 Eliot Teltscher /  Francisco González defeated  Colin Dibley /  Tom Gullikson 6–7, 7–5, 6–3

References

External links
 ITF tournament edition details

Bank of Oklahoma Classic
Bank of Oklahoma Classic
Bank of Oklahoma Classic
Tennis in Oklahoma